The Trinity School of John Whitgift, usually referred to as Trinity School, is a British private boys' day school with a co-educational Sixth Form, located in Shirley Park, Croydon. Part of the Whitgift Foundation, it was established in 1882 as Whitgift Middle School and was a direct grant grammar school from 1945 until 1968, when it left the scheme. The present name was adopted in 1954, to avoid confusion with Whitgift School. The school's head is now a member of the Headmasters' and Headmistresses' Conference (HMC).

The school's first home was in Church Road, central Croydon, and then from 1931 to 1965 it was at North End, Croydon, in the old premises of Whitgift School, which moved to Haling Park, South Croydon. The "romantic Gothic towers and verdant lawns" at North End, a building of historical significance, dominated the area, but in 1968 the whole edifice was torn down for redevelopment, despite public opposition. Today, the Whitgift Centre stands on the site, in a stark modernist contrast to the old building.

The school's current home was built in 1965 on the site of the former Shirley Park Hotel.

History
The school is part of the Whitgift Foundation, alongside Whitgift School and the Old Palace School for Girls. The Whitgift Foundation was founded in 1596 by John Whitgift, Archbishop of Canterbury. His legacy allows the School to provide outstanding facilities and a range of bursaries and scholarships, allowing children from all backgrounds to benefit from an exceptional independent school education.

Trinity School was founded in 1882 as Whitgift Middle School. Its original site was in Church Road in central Croydon, occupying the modest buildings of the Croydon Poor School which dated from 1858. In 1931 it moved to its second site in North End in Croydon. After years of confusion with Whitgift School, in 1954 Whitgift Middle School was renamed Trinity School of John Whitgift. However the school's Old Boys' Club was still known as the Old Mid-Whitgiftians until early 2010, when a vote was taken to change the name to the Trinity Mid-Whitgiftian Association.
thumb|upright=1.4|Trinity School of John Whitgift

The school was a direct grant grammar school from 1945 until 1968, when it left the scheme but continued to take LEA-funded pupils until the late 1970s.

Trinity School moved to its present and third home in Shirley in 1965, built on the site of the Shirley Park Hotel, which itself was a redevelopment of a large Georgian house called Shirley House, built in 1720, once a home of the third Earl of Eldon.

The school today
Many of Trinity's pupils come from local schools and so join aged 10 or 11, but there is also a large intake of prep school boys at 10, 11 and 13+. A traditional curriculum is studied by all pupils, with optional subjects at GCSE such as Mandarin Chinese becoming more popular.

The school has a co-educational Sixth Form, a feature that was implemented in September 2012. For this change, a new state-of-the-art Sixth Form Centre was built, and opened by the Mayor of London,  Boris Johnson.

Trinity has enjoyed regional and national success in its main school sports of rugby union, field hockey, cricket, and water polo, and also in other sports as diverse as swimming, athletics, and squash. The school has a climbing wall, two large astro-turf pitches and four hard tennis courts, along with pitches for rugby, cricket, soccer, and athletics, as well as the school's nearby field, Sandilands, and an indoor sports centre, with two large halls, several squash courts, a gymnasium, and an accompanying weights-room.

The school offers over 100 clubs and societies, from bee-keeping, chess, building Daleks, creative writing, fencing or landscape design. This encourages students to get involved as much as they can, helping them to discover passions, expand their horizons and to build relationships. 
The school’s World class music facilities include a recording suite and a dedicated choir room. Trinity became the first All Steinway School in London in 2012 and now benefits from an impressive fleet of 25 pianos, including two model D concert grand pianos and five further grand pianos. The Steinway Suite is the first teaching facility of its kind in the world, offering exceptional practice and research facilities.

The Trinity School chess club has achieved great success over the years. One of its members, Laurence Marks, won the under-21 British championship in 1973, and its teams were in the finals of the British Schools Championships of 1967, 1969, and 1972.

Trinity Boys Choir
Trinity Boys Choir, led for many years by David Squibb, is well known for its outstanding musical achievements, especially through its choristers under the direction of Director of Music, David Swinson. It has enjoyed a high professional profile, both at home and abroad, for the past forty years. In the world of opera, the boys appear on such prestigious stages as Glyndebourne, the Royal Opera House, Covent Garden, English National Opera and various opera houses abroad, including the Aix-en-Provence Festival, the Opéra-Comique, Paris, and La Fenice, Venice. The boys are especially well known for their part in Britten's A Midsummer Night's Dream, in which they have appeared in over one hundred and fifty professional performances, and they feature in the Warner DVD and Virgin Classics CD. They can be seen and heard in many different recordings of these operas.

In recent years the boys have appeared in many productions at the Royal Opera House, including Carmen, Parsifal, Tosca, Turandot, The Queen of Spades and Wozzeck, and were honoured to perform in Her Majesty the Queen's 80th Birthday Prom Concert and the BBC Proms at the Royal Albert Hall.

Recent orchestral collaborations have included work with Sir John Eliot Gardiner and his Monteverdi Choir, with whom they have given concerts in London, Spain, Germany, and Italy, including a performance of Monteverdi's Vespers in St Mark's, Venice, to mark the Monteverdi Choir's 40th birthday. Trinity Boys Choir has also performed in Vienna with the Vienna Boys' Choir, and in France, 
the Netherlands, Hong Kong, Japan, Malaysia and Norway.

In 2011 the boys appeared in the music video for the song "No Light, No Light" from the indie-rock band Florence and The Machine. They also appeared on the symphonic death metal opera album Quarterpast by Dutch metal supergroup MaYaN. The choir's most recent recording, REFUGIUM, with works by Howard Moody, Graham Lack and Judith Weir, was released in 2014 as an LP and a CD.

Headmasters
The current headmaster is Alasdair Kennedy, previously Deputy Master at Dulwich College, who joined the school in September 2016 on the retirement of Mark Bishop.

From 1882 to present
1882-1908: William Ingrams
1905-1919: Rev G A Jones
1919-1951: Horace Clayton
1952-1972: Oliver Berthoud
1972-1994: Robin Wilson
1995-1999: Barnaby Lenon
1999-2006: Christopher Tarrant
2006–2016: Mark Bishop
2016–Present: Alasdair Kennedy

Combined Cadet Force
The Combined Cadet Force (CCF) at Trinity consists of the three sections (Army, RAF and RN).  Pupils have the opportunity of joining the CCF in the Spring Term of the Third Form and the minimum length of service is four terms. Cadets then follow a common recruits' syllabus for two terms before choosing which of the three sections they wish to join. At the end of the Summer Term all cadets have the option to attend a UK Central Camp.

Notable former pupils

Former pupils of Trinity School of John Whitgift are known as Old Mid Whitgiftians.

Arts
Andrew Barnabas, video game music composer
Dane Bowers, former singer from band Another Level
Stephen Bryant, violinist, leader of the BBC Symphony Orchestra
Ken Burton, composer and conductor
Malcolm Douglas, illustrator
Mark Fleming, tenor in Cantabile - The London Quartet
William Gao, actor 
Andrew Gowers, former editor Financial Times
Stanley William Hayter, painter and print-maker
E G Handel Lucas (1861-1936), artist
Karl Lutchmayer, pianist
Mark Porter, designer
David Scarboro, actor
Colin Sell, pianist
Malcolm Sinclair, stage and television actor

Business
Stephen Haddrill, Director General, ABI
Ian Marchant, CEO of SSE plc

Military
Correlli Barnett, military historian
John Stacey, Air Chief Marshal
Paul Godfrey (RAF officer) OBE, Air Commodore, Commander United Kingdom Space Command

Politics and public service
Matthew David Baggott CBE QPM, Chief Constable of Northern Ireland
Gavin Barwell, Member of Parliament for Croydon Central (2010–17) and Assistant Whip to the Conservative Party; Downing Street Chief of Staff from 2017 to 2019. He was made Baron Barwell of Croydon in October 2019.
Jack Dunnett, former Member of Parliament (1964–83) for Nottingham Central and then  Nottingham East
Andrew Pelling, politician, former MP for Croydon Central
Daniel Zeichner, politician, Member of Parliament for Cambridge (2015-)

Science
Tim Broyd, civil engineer
Ian Craib, sociologist
Geoff Smith MBE, mathematician
Mike Stroud, doctor, adventurer and educator
Graham Stewart, bacteriologist
Nicholas Wareham, epidemiologist
Ross John Angel, mineralogist

Sport
Gary Butcher, Ex- Surrey and Glamorgan cricketer
Mark Butcher, Ex- England and Surrey cricketer
George Chuter, England rugby union player
Alex Codling, Ex - England rugby union Player
Lewis Grabban, Nottingham Forest F.C. striker
Sean King, Olympic Water Polo player
Imani-Lara Lansiquot, GB sprinter, Olympic bronze medalist 
Scott Newman, Surrey cricketer
Richard Nowell, former Surrey cricketer
Geoffrey Paish, English Davis Cup tennis star
Kieran Roche, rugby union player
Shane Roiser, rugby union player
Ian Watmore, Former Chief Executive, FA (The Football Association)
Gabriel Ibitoye, England rugby union player

Other
 Jeremy Sheehy, Anglican priest and academic

Notable ex staff members
Laurie Fishlock, Cricketer
Phil Keith-Roach, Forwards Rugby coach with England 2003 World Cup winners
Barnaby Lenon, Former headmaster Harrow School
Peter Smith, Union leader
David Squibb, Director of music
Ian Salisbury, Cricketer

References

External links
Official web site

Educational institutions established in the 1590s
Private boys' schools in London
Private schools in the London Borough of Croydon
Member schools of the Headmasters' and Headmistresses' Conference
 
1596 establishments in England
Church of England private schools in the Diocese of Southwark